"Supernaut" is the fifth song from the album Vol. 4 by British heavy metal band Black Sabbath.

In an interview with Q magazine, Beck Hansen named the "Supernaut" riff as his all-time favourite, equal with Neil Young's "Cinnamon Girl". The song was also a favorite of Frank Zappa and John Bonham. When played live, the song frequently featured a drum solo.

Personnel
Ozzy Osbourne – vocals
Tony Iommi – guitars
Geezer Butler – bass guitar
Bill Ward – drums, percussion
Technical personnel
Colin Caldwell, Vic Smith – engineering
Patrick Meehan – production

1000 Homo DJs version

The song was covered by Ministry side project 1000 Homo DJs in 1990. It was released as a 12-inch and CD single. The CD version of the single also contains the songs "Apathy" and "Better Ways", from the band's 1988 debut single, "Apathy."

Ned Raggett of AllMusic praised the cover, writing that "the title track is something else again, one of Al Jourgensen's best efforts at creating completely over-the-top industrial death disco. While it doesn't do much in the way of reinterpreting the original Black Sabbath number—no lyric changes, same basic pace—the amped-up guitars, huge drum fills, dancefloor-oriented pounding, and distorted lyrical screaming turn it into a massive, exhilarating crunch." Nevertheless, he stated that the b-side song, "Hey Asshole", was "consisting of little more than a shouted loop of the song title and a crunching rhythm as background for an extended rant by a character playing, indeed, an asshole of a cop"

Trent Reznor of Nine Inch Nails recorded the original vocals for the "Supernaut" cover. His vocals were not officially used because Reznor's label TVT Records refused to allow his appearance on the release. An oft-repeated story tells that instead of recording new vocals, the band's frontman Al Jourgensen merely altered Reznor's performance through a distortion effect to mask his identity.

Both Reznor and Jourgensen dismissed this claim. In a 1992 Prodigy post regarding "Supernaut," Reznor said, "[I] finally told Al to redo it without me. The version that Wax Trax put out is Al, the version on the NIN [bootleg] single is me." Jourgensen made a similar statement in a 2003 interview.  When asked whose vocals appear on "Supernaut," Jourgensen replied, "That would be me on the original, on WaxTrax!  The later version released on TVT was Trent Reznor... then the remixed version had my vocals on it."

The version with Reznor's vocals was eventually released on Black Box – Wax Trax! Records: The First 13 Years compilation album. The Al Jourgensen version of song was also featured in Black Sabbath tribute album, Nativity in Black.

Track listing
12" single
 "Supernaut" – 6:42
 "Hey Asshole" – 8:09

CD release
 "Supernaut" – 6:42
 "Hey Asshole" – 8:09
 "Apathy" – 4:36
 "Better Ways" – 5:23

Personnel
Count Ringworm – vocals on "Hey Asshole"
Al Jourgensen  – bass, guitar, vocals, vox organ on "Supernaut"
Ike Krull – guitar on "Supernaut"
Officer Agro – drums, vocals, vox organ on "Hey Asshole"
Wee Willie Reefer – drums on "Supernaut"
Viva Nova – vocals on "Hey Asshole"
The Temple Of Drool Choir – vocals on "Hey Asshole"
Trent Reznor – vocals on "Supernaut" (uncredited)
Technical personnel
Critter – engineering
Frisky – second engineering

Other cover versions
Coalesce on the 2007 reissue of their Led Zeppelin tribute EP entitled There is Nothing New Under the Sun and also on the Hydra Head Records Black Sabbath tribute album In These Black Days: Vol. 3.
Ministry performed “Supernaut” on their 1992 Psalm 69 tour, and, as Ministry & Co-Conspirators, recorded it on their compilation album Cover Up.
O'Connor (from Argentina) for Hay un Lugar (1999).
Turisas for a cover CD issued by UK magazine Metal Hammer.
The joint venture of Los Coronas and Arizona Baby covered the song in their 2011 live album Dos Bandas y un Destino.
STEMM (from Niagara Falls) for Crossroads (2011).

References

Black Sabbath songs
1972 songs
Songs written by Ozzy Osbourne
Songs written by Geezer Butler
Songs written by Tony Iommi
Songs written by Bill Ward (musician)
1990 singles
Wax Trax! Records albums
Trent Reznor
Songs about drugs